Nanyangzhai railway station is a station on the Beijing–Guangzhou railway and Zhengzhou–Jiaozuo intercity railway. The station is located in Huiji District, Zhengzhou, Henan, China.

History
The station was opened in 1919 as a station on the Beijing–Guangzhou railway.

In 2015, with the opening of Zhengzhou–Jiaozuo intercity railway, the station began to serve as a station for intercity trains.

References

Railway stations in Henan
Railway stations in Zhengzhou
Stations on the Zhengzhou–Jiaozuo intercity railway
Stations on the Beijing–Guangzhou Railway
Railway stations in China opened in 1919